Olaf Schwarz (born 2 April 1969) is a former West German male canoeist who was twice silver medalist in Canadian C1 at senior level at the Wildwater Canoeing World Championships.

References

External links
 Olaf Schwarz at Down River

1969 births
Living people
German male canoeists
Place of birth missing (living people)